The Bin Qasim Industrial Zone is one of the largest industrial areas in Karachi, Sindh, Pakistan. It consists of more than 25,000 acres of land in the Port Qasim (Bin Qasim) town area. Contained within this zone are many industrial units, ranging from medium to large in employment volume. Currently, there are 180 Large and Medium Size units operating in the area.

The Bin Qasim Industrial Zone has the potential to emerge as a Financial Hub of Karachi in the future: currently, there are a number of banks and insurance companies operating in the area. There are many large scale industrial companies operating in the area such as Pakistan Steel, Naztr Polymer (plastic bazar),  Lotte Pakistan PTA Ltd., Toyota Indus Motors, Pak Suzuki, Engro Polymer, FFC Jordan, Procter & Gamble, Ghandhara Nissan, National Foods, Nestle Pakistan, Fa uji Oil Terminals, Ali Danyal Industries, Gamalux Oleochemicals, Shujabad Agro Industries, PAN Industries, IFFCO Pakistan Ltd., Mapak Oil Ltd., Universal Cables Ltd., Faisalabad Oil Refinery and Tripak Films Ltd. are the prominent industrial unit.

BQATI or Bin Qasim Association of Trade and Industry, BQATI (formerly Port Qasim Association of Trade & Industry, PQATI) is a representative body of industries located in Bin Qasim industrial Zones. The Association was initially established with clear objectives to promote industrial activities in the area and to contribute positively to the economic well-being of the Country by way of enhancing industrial production.

References

Industrial Parks
 Federal B Industrial Area
 Karachi Export Processing Zone
 Korangi Creek Industrial Park
 Korangi Industrial Area
 North Karachi Industrial Area
 Pakistan Textile City
 S.I.T.E Industrial Area
 West Wharf Industrial Area

External links
 

Industrial parks in Karachi
1987 establishments in Pakistan
Korangi Town